Dryopteris arguta, with the common name coastal woodfern, is a species of wood fern. It is native to the west coast and western interior mountain ranges of North America, from British Columbia, throughout California, and into Arizona.

It is found in mixed evergreen forests, oak woodlands, and shady lower elevation slopes in chaparral and woodlands habitats.

Description

Dryopteris arguta is somewhat variable in appearance. Leaflets sometimes turn at an angle from the leaf, giving it a ruffled or lacy look, and the toothed leaflets may have bristles at their tips. According to C. Michael Hogan, The thin concave indusia are quite closely spaced and almost entirely cover the sporangia.

References

External links
Jepson Manual — Dryopteris arguta
CalFlora Database: Dryopteris arguta (California wood fern, Shield Fern, coastal wood fern)
USDA Plants Profile:  Dryopteris arguta

arguta
Ferns of California
Ferns of Canada
Ferns of Mexico
Ferns of the United States
Flora of the West Coast of the United States
Flora of Baja California
Flora of British Columbia
Flora of Arizona
Flora of Oregon
Flora of Washington (state)
Flora of the Sierra Nevada (United States)
Natural history of the California chaparral and woodlands
Natural history of the California Coast Ranges
Natural history of the Peninsular Ranges
Natural history of the Santa Monica Mountains
Natural history of the Transverse Ranges
Plants described in 1824
Garden plants of North America